Serrata is a genus of sea snails, marine gastropod mollusks in the subfamily Austroginellinae  of the family Marginellidae, the margin snails.

Species
Species within the genus Serrata include:

 Serrata amphora Boyer, 2008
 Serrata arcuata Boyer, 2008
 Serrata aureosa Boyer, 2008
 Serrata bathusi Boyer, 2008
 Serrata beatrix (Cossignani, 2001)
 Serrata boucheti (Boyer, 2001)
 Serrata boussoufae (Bozzetti & Briano, 2008)
 Serrata brianoi Bozzetti, 1994
 Serrata carinata Boyer, 2008
 Serrata cittadinii T. Cossignani, 2020
 Serrata coriolis Boyer, 2008
 Serrata cossignanorum Bozzetti, 1997
 Serrata cylindrata Boyer, 2008
 Serrata delessertiana (Récluz, 1841)
 Serrata dentata Boyer, 2008
 Serrata exquisita Boyer, 2008
 Serrata fasciata (Sowerby G.B. II, 1846)
 † Serrata flemingi P. A. Maxwell, 1988 
 Serrata fusulina Boyer, 2008
 Serrata gradata Boyer, 2008
 Serrata granum Boyer, 2008
 † Serrata hectori (Kirk, 1882)
 Serrata hians Boyer, 2008
 Serrata inflata Boyer, 2008
 Serrata isabelae (Bozzetti, 2005)
 † Serrata kirki (Marwick, 1924) 
 Serrata laevis Boyer, 2008
 Serrata lifouana Boyer, 2008
 Serrata magna Boyer, 2008
 Serrata maoriana (Powell, 1932)
 † Serrata marwicki (Finlay, 1927) 
 Serrata meta (Thiele, 1925) 
 Serrata microdentata Boyer, 2018
 Serrata minima Boyer, 2008
 Serrata mustelina (Angas, 1871) 
 Serrata occidentalis Boyer, 2008
 Serrata orientalis Boyer, 2008
 Serrata osteri Jousseaume, 1875
 Serrata ovata Boyer, 2008
 Serrata perlucida Boyer, 2008
 Serrata polynesiae Wakefield & McCleery, 2002
 Serrata procera Boyer, 2008
 † Serrata propinqua (Tate, 1878) 
 Serrata pupoides Boyer, 2008
 Serrata quadrifasciata Boyer, 2008
 Serrata raiatea Wakefield & McCleery, 2002
 Serrata raoulica Marshall, 2004
 Serrata robusta Boyer, 2008
 Serrata serrata'' (Gaskoin, 1849)
 Serrata simplex Boyer, 2008
 Serrata sinuosa Boyer, 2008
 Serrata spryi (Clover, 1974)
 Serrata stylaster (Boyer, 2001) 
 Serrata summa Boyer, 2008
 Serrata tahanea Wakefield & McCleery, 2002
 Serrata tenuis Boyer, 2008
 Serrata translata Redfield, 1870
 Serrata tuii (Cossignani, 2001)
 Serrata veneria Boyer, 2008
 † Serrata winteri (Tate, 1878) 

 Species brought into synonymy
 Serrata albescens (Hutton, 1873): synonym of Volvarina albescens (Hutton, 1873)
 Serrata caledonica Jousseaume, 1877: synonym of Hydroginella caledonica (Jousseaume, 1877)
 Serrata columnaria (Hedley & May, 1908): synonym of Hydroginella columnaria (Hedley & May, 1908)
 Serrata delessertiana (Récluz, 1841): synonym of Hydroginella delessertiana (Récluz, 1841)
 Serrata dispersa Laseron, 1957: synonym of Hydroginella dispersa (Laseron, 1957)
 Serrata fascicula (Laseron, 1957): synonym of Hydroginella fascicula (Laseron, 1957)
 Serrata guttula (G.B. Sowerby I, 1832): synonym of Hydroginella guttula (G. B. Sowerby I, 1832)
 Serrata lienardi Jousseaume, 1875: synonym of Hydroginella sordida (Reeve, 1865)
 Serrata mixta (Petterd, 1884): synonym of Hydroginella mixta (Petterd, 1884)
 Serrata osteri Jousseaume, 1875: synonym of Hydroginella osteri (Jousseaume, 1875) (original combination)
 Serrata parvistriata (Suter, 1908): synonym of Volvarina parvistriata (Suter, 1908)
 Serrata plicatula (Suter, 1909): synonym of Volvarina plicatula'' (Suter, 1909)
 Serrata pyriformis Pease, 1868: synonym of Serrata translata Redfield, 1870
 Serrata sagamiensis (Kuroda, Habe & Oyama, 1971): synonym of Hyalina sagamiensis Kuroda, Habe & Oyama, 1971
 Serrata scintilla Jousseaume, 1875: synonym of Hydroginella scintilla (Jousseaume, 1875) (original combination)
 Serrata sordida (Reeve, 1865): synonym of Serrata delessertiana (Récluz, 1841)
 Serrata tridentata (Tate, 1878): synonym of Hydroginella tridentata (Tate, 1878)
 Serrata triplicata Gaskoin, 1849: synonym of Granulina guttula (G. B. Sowerby I, 1832): synonym of Hydroginella guttula (G. B. Sowerby I, 1832)

References

 Laseron, C. F. (1957). A new classification of the Australian Marginellidae (Mollusca), with a review of species from the Solanderian and Dampierian zoogeographical provinces. Australian Journal of Marine and Freshwater Research. 8 (3): 274-311
 Boyer F. (2008). The genus Serrata Jousseaume, 1875 (Caenogastropoda: Marginellidae) in New Caledonia. Mémoires du Muséum National d'Histoire Naturelle 196 : 389-436
 Cossignani T. (2006). Marginellidae & Cystiscidae of the World. L'Informatore Piceno. 408pp

External links
 Jousseaume F. (1875). Coquilles de la famille des marginelles. Monographie. Revue et Magazin de Zoologie. ser. 3, 3: 164-271; 429-435
 Coovert, G. A.; Coovert, H. K. (1995). Revision of the supraspecific classification of marginelliform gastropods. The Nautilus. 109(2-3): 43-100.

Gastropod genera
Marginellidae